Hani Garmaleh (also Romanized as Hānī Garmaleh; also known as Kānī Garmaleh) is a village in Sirvan Rural District, Nowsud District, Paveh County, Kermanshah Province, Iran. At the 2006 census, its population was 386, in 118 families.

References 

Populated places in Paveh County